The 2010 NCAA Division I baseball tournament began on Friday, June 4, 2010 as part of the 2010 NCAA Division I baseball season.  The 64 team double elimination tournament concluded with the 2010 College World Series in Omaha, Nebraska. This was the final year at Johnny Rosenblatt Stadium, the host venue since 1950.

The South Carolina Gamecocks won two elimination games against archrival Clemson in the College World Series semifinals, then defeated the UCLA Bruins in the second game of the finals on a walk-off single by Whit Merrifield to win the national championship. It was the school's first championship in baseball and second team championship overall.

Bids

Automatic bids 
Conference champions from 30 Division I conferences earned automatic bids to regionals.  The remaining 34 spots were awarded to schools as at-large invitees.

Bids by conference

National seeds
Bold indicates CWS participant.

 Arizona State
 Texas
 Florida
 
 Virginia
 UCLA

Regionals and super regionals
Bold indicates winner. * indicates extra innings.

Tempe Super Regional

Clemson Super Regional
Hosted by Clemson at Doug Kingsmore Stadium

Charlottesville Super Regional

Myrtle Beach Super Regional
NOTE:  Because Vrooman Field at Charles Watson Stadium was inadequate for NCAA postseason play, Coastal Carolina-hosted games were played at BB&T Coastal Field.

Austin Super Regional

Tallahassee Super Regional
Hosted by Florida State at Dick Howser Stadium

Los Angeles Super Regional

Gainesville Super Regional

College World Series

Participants

Bracket
The CWS uses two four-team brackets with double elimination format; teams play games until they accumulate two losses and no team may play a team from the other bracket.  The winners of the two four-team brackets play a best-of-three series for the championship.

 * Denotes extra innings

Championship series

Game 1

Game 2

All-Tournament Team

The following players were members of the College World Series All-Tournament Team.

Final standings
Seeds listed below indicate national seeds only

 # denotes national seed

Record by conference

The columns RF, SR, WS, NS, CS, and NC respectively stand for the regional finals, super regionals, College World Series, national semifinals, championship series, and national champion.

Tournament notes

Round 1
15 of 16 No. 1 seeds won their first-round games, with Cal State Fullerton being the only No. 1 seed to lose (3-1 to No. 4 Minnesota).
Eight No. 3 seeds (half the field) won their first-round games in upsets.

Round 2
13 of 16 No. 1 seeds won their first 2 games.  The others were: No. 4 Minnesota, No. 2 Clemson and No. 2 College of Charleston
Two No. 2 seeds were eliminated in two games: No. 2 California and No. 2 Stanford

Regional finals
13 No. 1 seeds and three No. 2 seeds advanced to the Super Regional; no No. 3 or No. 4 seeds advanced.
Georgia Tech (No. 8) and Louisville (No. 7) were the only national seeds to not advance to the Super Regional.

Super regionals
TCU qualified for its first ever College World Series by beating Texas.
Only 3 of 8 National Seeds qualified for the College World Series.

College World Series

 NCBWA (National College Baseball Writers Association) named TCU Head coach Jim Schlossnagle the 2010 National Coach of the Year.
 Collegiate Baseball and Baseball America named South Carolina Head coach Ray Tanner the 2010 National Coach of the Year.
 UCLA head coach John Savage was named the national Coach of the Year by College Baseball Insider.
 South Carolina received the Opening Ceremonies award for highest team GPA (3.12) of the eight schools that made it to Omaha.
 Only one team from the 2009 CWS, Arizona State, returned for 2010.
 This was the 18th consecutive year that the SEC has fielded at least one team in the College World Series.
 South Carolina pitcher Matt Price (first team) and first baseman Christian Walker (second team) were named Freshman All-Americans by Baseball America.
 UCLA center fielder Beau Amaral, who led the Bruins with a .354 batting average in 64 games, was named a second-team Freshman All-America selection by Baseball America.
 UCLA pitchers Trevor Bauer and Gerrit Cole were named to the 2010 College All-America Team (second-team and third-team, respectively) by Baseball America.

First and second rounds
 TCU played in its first College World Series in school history.
 Florida was the first team eliminated after its 8–5 loss to in-state rival Florida State.
 Arizona State was eliminated after two games and became the first No. 1 overall seed team to go 0–2 in the CWS under the current 64-team format.
 Florida State had a season-high 5 errors in its second loss to TCU.
 In the first meeting between South Carolina and Oklahoma, the game was scheduled to start at 2:00 pm, but due to multiple weather delays the game did not end until after 11:00 pm.

Semi-finals
 None of the four semi-finalists, UCLA, TCU, South Carolina and Clemson, had won a previous CWS title.
 This CWS was the first since 2005 to feature an in-state rivalry in the final four with the meeting of South Carolina and Clemson.
 Trevor Bauer, with 13 strikeouts on June 26, led the nation with 165 strikeouts; UCLA led all schools with 700 strikeouts.

Finals
 UCLA played for its first-ever national championship in baseball (South Carolina had played in three previous Championship Games, 1975, 1977 and 2002).
 More than 300,000 fans attended the men's CWS for the fourth consecutive year, and the total attendance of 330,922 ranks second all-time.
 South Carolina won its first NCAA team national championship in any men's sport.
 UCLA's runner-up finish was the best in program history.
 Final game was the first championship to be decided in extra innings since 1970, and fifth all-time.
 Whit Merrifield's 11th-inning RBI single was the first walk-off to decide a championship since 2000.
 South Carolina became only the third school to win a CWS title after losing their opening game since the two-bracket format was adopted.
 South Carolina set a CWS record with six straight wins after losing their first game, and became only the third school ever to record six victories in a CWS.
 The CWS ended June 29, the latest ending date for the tournament. That record was broken in 2016.

References

NCAA Division I Baseball Championship
Tournament
Baseball in Austin, Texas
Baseball in the Dallas–Fort Worth metroplex